Anjulí Mariana Ladrón de Guevara Guereña (born 7 October 1986) is a Mexican former professional football goalkeeper who last played for Tigres UANL of the Liga MX Femenil.

She played for the Mexico U20 at the 2006 FIFA U-20 Women's World Championship.

Other sports 
In 2017 Ladrón de Guevara took up cricket and played for the Mexico women's national cricket team at the 2019 Central American Cricket Championship at the Reforma Athletic Club, Mexico City; Ladrón de Guevara received a trophy as the T20I tournament's best player. She has represented her country internationally in five disciplines: soccer (both in its traditional version and in seven-on-seven), American football, a precision sport called footgolf (a combo of golf and soccer) and cricket.

References

External links
 
 

1986 births
Living people
Mexican women's footballers
Footballers from Jalisco
People from Puerto Vallarta
Mexico women's international footballers
Universiade silver medalists for Mexico
Universiade medalists in football
Mexican expatriate women's footballers
Mexican expatriate sportspeople in Russia
Mexican expatriate sportspeople in Spain
Mexican expatriate sportspeople in the United States
Mexican expatriate sportspeople in Ukraine
Expatriate women's footballers in Russia
Expatriate women's footballers in Spain
Expatriate women's soccer players in the United States
Expatriate women's footballers in Ukraine
C.D. Guadalajara (women) footballers
FC Zorky Krasnogorsk (women) players
WFC Naftokhimik Kalush players
Liga MX Femenil players
Club Tijuana (women) footballers
Tigres UANL (women) footballers
Women's association football goalkeepers
Mexican women cricketers
Medalists at the 2013 Summer Universiade
Mexican footballers